Skambankt (Beaten to a pulp or beaten up) is a Norwegian hard rock band from Klepp, just south of Stavanger. They play a mixture of classic rock'n'roll, punk and hardrock in the tradition of bands like Motörhead, AC/DC, Sex Pistols, Ramones and The Stooges. All the lyrics are in Norwegian.

History
The band was founded in 1994 when a band who was going to play at a concert couldn't make it. They took the challenge to step in for the cancelled act, and wrote nine songs the same day and performed them later that evening. The line-up was Ted Winters on guitar and vocals, Don Fist on bass, and Hanz Panzer on drums. But at that time there was not more than a few live-gigs and some demo recordings. Ten years later, the original Skambankt line-up met at a stag-party where there was a stage with full backline. Some time after midnight, a decision was made that the band should be continued. This time, it was easy to get a record deal, and after Hans Panzer shifted to play the second guitar and handed his drumsticks over to Tom Skalle, the band was ready to record their first self-titled album Skambankt, which came out in 2004. This album includes the video-hit KKK (Kristelig KulturKaos), featuring Prepple Homb on guest vocals.

Since then, Skambankt have played many concerts and festival shows, in Norway, Denmark and even Germany. The highlight up to now was probably their gig at Roskilde Festival 2005 where they played for 20.000 people.

In 2005, they released the EP Skamania, containing six new tracks as well as two videos. Also in 2005, Bones Wolsman (Børge Henriksen) joined the band, replacing Tom Skalle on drums.

In 2007, they released their second full-length album, Eliksir. The first single from the album, Tyster was b-listed on Norwegian radio, and the album got decent reviews. A video was made for the track Dynasti. It entered the Norwegian album charts on the 8th place. During this year they toured a lot, playing shows around the land of Norway.

In fall 2008, Skambankt entered the studio for a third time, this time to record their third album, Hardt Regn. The first single from the album, "Malin" was released on their MySpace in October. The album was released on January 27, and received good reviews as well as a respectable chart placement during the first week of its release.

Skambankt supported the Danish rockband D-A-D on their Monster Philosophy Tour in Denmark in 2009 and AC/DC at their Valle Hovin, Oslo concert on June 15, 2009.

Skambankt released their fourth full length effort entitled Søvnløs on September 6, 2010. The album's first single "Mantra" was released on the 17th of May, the Norwegian national day.

The fifth album Sirene was released on January 27, 2014. The first single of the album, "Voodoo", was released in November 2013 with a marketing stunt where fans could hand in old plastic guitars which would then be melted in and transformed into vinyl records. Also, the single was accompanied by its own brand of beer, brewed at Kinn Bryggeri in Florø, and called "Voodoo" as well.

The sixth album, Horisonten brenner, was produced by Janove Ottesen. It was released on February 9, 2018.

Line-up 
Ted Winters (Terje Winterstø Røthing) - guitar, vocals
Hanz Panzer (Hans Egil Løe) - guitar, backing vocals
Don Fist (Tollak Friestad) - bass, backing vocals
Bones Wolsman (Børge Henriksen) - drums

Discography

Albums 
Skambankt (2004)
Eliksir (2007)
Hardt Regn (2009)
Søvnløs (2010)
 Sirene (2014)
 Horisonten brenner (2018)
 1994 (2019)
 Jærtegn (2020)

EPs/Singles/Others 
Skamania (2005)
Fremmed I En Fremmed Verden/Balladen Om Deg (2017)
For En Evighet/Om Nettene (2019)

External links 
Official website
Facebook
Instagram

Notes 

Musical groups established in 1994
Musical groups disestablished in 1995
Musical groups reestablished in 2004
Norwegian rock music groups